Thibo Somers (born 16 March 1999) is a Belgian football player. He plays for Cercle Brugge.

Club career
He made his Belgian First Division A debut for Cercle Brugge on 26 October 2019 in a game against Genk. Six weeks later, on 7 December 2019 he scored his first goal for Cercle. At the end of the season, he was voted by supporters as the winner of the Pop Poll d'Echte, only with 13 first team appearances at that time in which he started 5 times.

References

External links
 

1999 births
Living people
Belgian footballers
Association football midfielders
Cercle Brugge K.S.V. players
Belgian Pro League players